Davenport is a city in Cass County, North Dakota, United States. The population was 256 at the 2020 census. Davenport was founded in 1882.

History
Davenport was platted in 1882 when the railroad was extended to that point. The city was named for Mary Buckland Claflin, wife of Massachusetts governor William Claflin. A post office has been in operation at Davenport since 1882.

Geography
Davenport is located at  (46.714074, -97.067749).

Demographics

2010 census
As of the census of 2010, there were 252 people, 93 households, and 71 families living in the city. The racial makeup of the city was 92.9% White, 0.4% Native American, 4.0% from other races, and 2.8% from two or more races. Hispanic or Latino of any race were 10.7% of the population.

There were 93 households, of which 40.9% had children under the age of 18 living with them, 66.7% were married couples living together, 6.5% had a female householder with no husband present, 3.2% had a male householder with no wife present, and 23.7% were non-families. 18.3% of all households were made up of individuals, and 3.2% had someone living alone who was 65 years of age or older. The average household size was 2.71 and the average family size was 3.14.

The median age in the city was 32 years. 31% of residents were under the age of 18; 2.7% were between the ages of 18 and 24; 34.9% were from 25 to 44; 24.3% were from 45 to 64; and 7.1% were 65 years of age or older. The gender makeup of the city was 48.4% male and 51.6% female.

2000 census
As of the census of 2000, there were 261 people, 91 households, and 77 families living in the city. The population density was 2,091.2 people per square mile (839.8/km2). There were 92 housing units at an average density of 737.1 per square mile (296.0/km2). The racial makeup of the city was 98.47% White and 1.53% Asian. Hispanic or Latino of any race were 1.53% of the population.

There were 91 households, out of which 49.5% had children under the age of 18 living with them, 71.4% were married couples living together, 5.5% had a female householder with no husband present, and 14.3% were non-families. 11.0% of all households were made up of individuals, and 3.3% had someone living alone who was 65 years of age or older. The average household size was 2.87 and the average family size was 3.10.

In the city, the population was spread out, with 34.1% under the age of 18, 7.7% from 18 to 24, 36.0% from 25 to 44, 14.6% from 45 to 64, and 7.7% who were 65 years of age or older. The median age was 30 years. For every 100 females, there were 93.3 males. For every 100 females age 18 and over, there were 97.7 males.

The median income for a household in the city was $48,889, and the median income for a family was $53,125. Males had a median income of $31,786 versus $23,750 for females. The per capita income for the city was $18,737. None of the population or families were below the poverty line.

References

Cities in Cass County, North Dakota
Cities in North Dakota
Populated places established in 1882